Brembate di Sopra is a comune (municipality) in the Province of Bergamo in the Italian region of Lombardy, located about  northeast of Milan and about  northwest of Bergamo.

Brembate di Sopra borders the following municipalities: Almenno San Bartolomeo, Barzana, Mapello, Ponte San Pietro, Valbrembo.

History 
The first urbanization here was the work of the Romans, mindful of the strategic importance of the nearby road connecting Bergamo to Como. Archeological finds have confirmed the existence of Roman military camps in the area.

The region was subsequently dominated by the Lombards who included it within the Duchy of Bergamo.   The district is often included as part of Lemine during this period.

The earliest written records of Brembate date back to 856. The village, which takes its name from its proximity to the river Brembo, began to be referred to as 'Brembate di Sopra' (Upper Brembate) to distinguish it from Brembate di Sotto (now known simply as Brembate) to the south.

In 2010, Brembate di Sopra resident Yara Gambirasio was murdered here.

International relations

 
Brembate di Sopra is twinned with:
 Ostrów Mazowiecka, Poland
 Iziaslav, Ukraine

References